Baghsar Fort is an ancient fort built in Samahni Valley near Bhimber, Pakistan, close to a place known as Baghsar. The fort was constructed by Mughal rulers. Some parts of it are currently closed to visitors, due to it being right beside the line of control between Pakistan and India.

History

Very little knowledge is available about the true history of the fort. It is widely believed that fort was built by Mughals but Godfrey Vigne, an English traveller who extensively traveled through Kashmir tells it was built by Dhian Singh, brother of Maharaja Ghulab Singh Dogra. He mentioned it as Amur Gurh castle in his book.

Layout
 

Outer perimeter consists of boundary wall and thirty eight small rooms while inner side of the fort consists of darbar hall, a water pond and forty three rooms. There are three entrances to the fort. Northern main entrance, south eastern entrance and the entrance to inner perimeter. Observation point is prominent on the south eastern corner. There is a firing bay on western wall. Fort is surrounded by embrasures in the walls to allow archers to fire and remain under cover.

Tomb of Jahangir
Mughal emperor Jahangir on his way to Lahore from Kashmir died somewhere in between Chingus Sarai, Rajouri and Sarai Saadabad, Bhimber. To preserve his body his entrails were removed and buried in Baghsar fort. Then body was sent to Lahore where it was buried in mausoleum built along the banks of Ravi.

Conservation
Despite being on line of control, structure of the fort is still intact. But it is severely neglected by government in regard to conservation.

See also

 List of UNESCO World Heritage Sites in Pakistan
 List of forts in Pakistan
 List of museums in Pakistan

References  

Forts in Azad Kashmir
Castles in Pakistan